Battle of Mazyr (February 8-February 9, 1649), was a battle of the Khmelnytsky Uprising. Polish–Lithuanian Commonwealth forces under the command of Janusz Radziwiłł defeated the Ukrainian Cossacks and captured the city of Mazyr.

References
Piotr Borawski: Tatarzy w dawnej Rzeczypospolitej. Warszawa: Ludowa Spółdzielnia Wydawnicza, 1986, p. 133–134. .

Conflicts in 1649
1649 in Europe
Mazyr